Clifton and Compton is a civil parish in the Derbyshire Dales district of Derbyshire, England.  The parish contains eight listed buildings that are recorded in the National Heritage List for England.  Of these, one is listed at Grade II*, the middle of the three grades, and the others are at Grade II, the lowest grade.  The parish contains the villages of Clifton and Hangingbridge, and the surrounding area.  The listed buildings consist of houses, cottages and associated structures, a church, its lychgate and wall, a road bridge, and a public house.


Key

Buildings

References

Citations

Sources

 

Lists of listed buildings in Derbyshire